The Seoul Awards is an awards ceremony hosted by Sports Seoul. It honors outstanding achievements in film and television. It was first established in 2017 and is held annually.

Ceremony

Categories
Grand Prize
Best Actor
Best Actress
Best Supporting Actor
Best Supporting Actress
Best New Actor
Best New Actress
Special Acting Award
Popularity Award

Film

Grand Prize

Best Actor

Best Actress

Best Supporting Actor

Best Supporting Actress

Best New Actor

Best New Actress

Drama

Grand Prize

Best Actor

Best Actress

Best Supporting Actor

Best Supporting Actress

Best New Actor

Best New Actress

Other awards

Special Acting Award

Popular Actor Award

Popular Actress Award

Hallyu Artist Award

See also

 List of Asian television awards

References

External links
  

Awards established in 2017
2017 establishments in South Korea
South Korean film awards
South Korean television awards
Annual events in South Korea